Wabanko Banko (born 13 July 1960) is a Congolese boxer. He competed in the men's light middleweight event at the 1988 Summer Olympics.

References

1960 births
Living people
Democratic Republic of the Congo male boxers
Olympic boxers of the Democratic Republic of the Congo
Boxers at the 1988 Summer Olympics
Place of birth missing (living people)
Light-middleweight boxers